This is a list of electoral results for the Electoral district of Portland in Victorian state elections.

Members for Portland

Election results

Elections in the 1990s

Elections in the 1980s

Elections in the 1970s

Elections in the 1960s

Elections in the 1950s

Elections in the 1940s

References

Victoria (Australia) state electoral results by district